First-seeded Louise Brough defeated Doris Hart, 6–4, 3–6, 6–4 in the final to win the women's singles tennis title at the 1950 Australian Championships. The event was played on outdoor grass courts in Melbourne, Australia.

Seeds
The seeded players are listed below. Louise Brough is the champion; others show the round in which they were eliminated.
 Louise Brough (champion)
 Doris Hart (finalist)
 Nancye Bolton (semifinals)
 Joyce Fitch (semifinals)
 Thelma Long (quarterfinals)
 Mary Hawton (quarterfinals)
 Nell Hopman (quarterfinals)
 Esme Ashford (second round)

Draw

Finals

Top half

Bottom half

External links
 

1950 in women's tennis
1950
1950 in Australian tennis
1950 in Australian women's sport